Thenikkudi Keeranār (Tamil: தேனிக்குடிக் கீரனார்) was a poet of the Sangam period to whom verse 49 of the Tiruvalluva Maalai.

Biography
Thenikkudi Keeranar was a poet belonging to the late Sangam period that corresponds between 1st century BCE and 2nd century CE. He hailed from the town named Thenikkudi. He is also known for a verse on the bee in the Sangam literature.

View on Valluvar and the Kural
Thenikkudi Keeranar has authored verse 49 of the Tiruvalluva Maalai. He opines about Valluvar and the Kural text thus:

See also

 Sangam literature
 List of Sangam poets
 Tiruvalluva Maalai

Citations

References

 
 

Tamil philosophy
Tamil poets
Sangam poets
Tiruvalluva Maalai contributors